Union Sportive Montagnarde is a French football club founded in 1937. They are based in the town of Inzinzac-Lochrist and their home stadium is the Stade Mané Braz, which has a capacity of 3,500 spectators. For the 2022–23 season they play in Championnat National 3, the fifth tier of French football, after winning promotion in 2022.

The club notably reached the Round of 16 of the Coupe de France in both 1999 as a tier five side, and 2002 as a tier six side.

References

Montagnarde
1937 establishments in France
Sport in Morbihan
Football clubs in Brittany